Matija Vojsalić was the last member of the Bosnian noble family, the Hrvatinić.

He was the last mentioned in 1476, in the document stored in the archives of Republic of Ragusa. He was installed as King of Bosnia by the Ottoman Sultan as an answer to Nicholas of Ilok who was also named King of Bosnia by King Matthias Corvinus of Hungary. Vojsalić replaced Matthias of Bosnia as the Ottoman King of Bosnia.

However, he was accused of conspiring with the King of Hungary against the Ottomans, and removed from the throne. After this he was not mentioned anymore.

References

|-

Ottoman governors of Bosnia
Pretenders to the Bosnian throne
Hrvatinić noble family
Conquest
Year of death unknown
Year of birth unknown
Kings of Bosnia